Page 2 Stage is screenwriting software designed expressly for people writing screenplays, scripts, and plays. The formatting required for writing movie and TV Script is very specific (see Screenplay) and general word processors are more difficult to use for such tasks. Page 2 Stage supports the common script formats.

Open source 
Page 2 Stage was originally a commercial product. However, it is now released as open source and can be downloaded from Windward Reports. There is a discussion about how the end of the commercial life for Page 2 Stage was handled at the CEO's blog.

The source code is available for download and Windward has offered to help any individuals who wish to create an open source project for the program. However, as of this date no open source effort exists. To express interest in creating a project, post in the suggestions forum.

Although the program is now free, several online writer stores still offer it for sale. It appears that it is exactly the same program.

Multiple languages 
Page 2 Stage includes resources in 30 different languages so all menus, dialog boxes, etc. are in the language of the user, including Asian languages and bi-directional languages such as Arabic and Hebrew.

Unique features 
Page 2 Stage has several reports that are very useful in writing a screenplay. First is several graphs that create a picture of both the flow of the scenes and the flow of character's dialogue. This helps to balance out the script.

Second is a concordance of each character's dialogue. This helps the writer create a unique voice for each character.

References

Reviews 
The Online Communicator Screenplay Formatting Software from the Bottom Up.
Writer's Inkwell Page2Stage - Free screenwriting program.
iDnez.cz Page 2 Stage (in Czech)
Vladimir Ilich Bryksin Page 2 Stage (in Russian)

External links

Download of source file
Download of binary program for Microsoft Windows
alternate Download of binary program for Microsoft Windows
Download page of program & source files (dead) (archive.org mirror)
Support Forum (dead) (archive.org mirror)

Word processors
Screenwriting software